Maya Attoun (1974 – 18 July 2022) was an Israeli multidisciplinary artist, born in Jerusalem. She lived and worked in Tel Aviv.

Early life
Attoun graduated from the Bezalel Academy of Arts and Design, where she received her BFA in 1997 and an MFA in 2006. She was a lecturer at Shenkar College of Engineering and Design in Ramat-Gan.

Career 
In 2007, Attoun took part in The Finalists Exhibition and the Tel Aviv Museum of Art, for the Nathan Gottesdiener Foundation Israel Art Prize 2008. The exhibition also included Michal Helfman, and Gil Marco Shani. The artists’ work was significant as they extended from painting to installation.

In 2015, Attoun had a solo exhibition in Givon Art Gallery in Tel Aviv titled Half Full. For the exhibition, Attoun completely changed the interior of the gallery, building walls and corridors to resemble a house. The space was made to look like a "half full״ apartment, in which the viewer was made to assume the dweller has left the premises or the property, but some of their belongings remain. The exhibition was well-received.

In 2017, Attoun had a solo exhibition at the Haifa Museum of Art titled Lover's Eye. The exhibition encompassed twenty-five framed eye drawings. The drawings allude to the 18th century eye miniatures of "Lovers’ Eyes," usually painted with watercolor on ivory or parchment.

In 2018, Attoun published an Artist book, titled Weekly Planner 2018 which revisits the year of 1818. The book marks the 200th anniversary of Mary Shelley’s Frankenstein – hybridizing the two years through monochromatic drawings akin to old manuscripts, etchings, and prints.

Style, technique, and themes 
Attoun was a multidisciplinary artist. Her works involve a variety of mediums; yet, drawings comprise an important element in her body of work. Her drawings are often in pencil. Attoun's installations typically encompass a variety of media, including murals, drawings, prints, sculptural objects, ready-mades, and sound art. Much of Attoun's imagery thematically surrounds the body. Some elements of her visual arsenal include, animals, skulls, hearts, blood vessels, ropes, stalks, and cups.

Attoun's installations are part of a feminist trend, which combine beauty and horror, blood and disease, body, and home. Much of Attoun's imagery is associated with formal European iconography and motifs, drawing reference from the neo-Gothic, Romantic, Pre-Raphaelite, and Arts and Crafts movements of the 18th–19th centuries.

Exhibitions 
 2006 SoulSeek, Lohamei Ha'getaot Gallery, Kibbutz Lohamei Ha'getaot
 2007 Heart of Gold, Levontin Exhibition Space, Tel Aviv  
 2007 Blood Related, Janco Dada Museum, Ein Hod
 2008 Modes of Application, Habres+Partner Gallery, Vienna
 2009 Entre Chien et Loup – Finalists Exhibition, Gottesdiener Foundation Israeli Art Prize 2008, Tel Aviv Museum of Art 
 2011 Threshold of Hearing, Lohamei Ha'getaot Gallery, Kibbutz Lohamei HaGeta'ot 
 2011 Equations for a Falling Body, Givon Art Gallery, Tel-Aviv 
 2011–12 Falling in Line with Hilla Ben Ari, Marie-Laure Flisch Gallery, Rome
 2015, Half Full, Givon Art Gallery, Tel-Aviv 
 2017 Lover's Eye, Haifa Museum of Art, Haifa
 2018 Book Launch, 2018 Artist Book and Weekly Planner, Givon Art Forum, Tel-Aviv
 2018, The Charms of Frankenstein, Jewish Museum London
 2019  Jerusalem Print Workshop
 2021, Solar Mountains and Broken Hearts, Magasin III, Jaffa

References 

1974 births
2022 deaths
21st-century Israeli women artists
Artists from Jerusalem
Bezalel Academy of Arts and Design alumni
Tel Aviv University alumni
21st-century Israeli artists